Golden Spoon Frozen Yogurt is a frozen yogurt retail chain headquartered in Rancho Santa Margarita, California. Stores are located in the western United States, mainly in California, Nevada and Arizona, and internationally in Tokyo and Sendai, Japan and Metro Manila, Philippines.

Golden Spoon stores provide a variety of frozen yogurt flavors and toppings. Employees serve the yogurt in cones or cups with their signature golden plastic spoon.

See also
 List of frozen yogurt companies
 List of frozen dessert brands

References

External links 
 

Restaurants established in 1983
Companies based in Orange County, California
Economy of the Southwestern United States
Regional restaurant chains in the United States
Frozen yogurt businesses
Brand name frozen desserts
1983 establishments in California